Adam Lucas (born 27 October 1983) is an Australian swimmer who specialized in individual medley (IM) events. He remains a well respected swimmer amongst the Western Australian and Tasmanian community, and holds a regional short course record in the 200 m individual medley. He also notched a bronze medal in the same stroke at the 2003 Summer Universiade in Daegu, South Korea, with a personal best of 2:03.06. He represented Australia in the 2004 Summer Olympics in Athens, swimming in the 200m IM.
Lucas is a member of West Coast Swim Club in Perth, and is coached and trained by Grant Stoelwinder.

Personal
Adam Lucas was born on 27 October 1983 in Hobart, Tasmania.
He attended St Mark’s Anglican Community School in Hillarys, Western Australia, where he was captain of their ACC Swim Team. He graduated from St. Mark's in 2000.

Swimming career
Lucas qualified for the men's 200 m individual medley at the 2004 Summer Olympics in Athens, by clearing a FINA A-standard entry time of 2:01.94 from the Olympic trials in Sydney. He challenged seven other swimmers on the seventh heat, including top medal favorite Michael Phelps. Lucas raced to seventh place by 0.37 of a second behind three-time Olympian Tamás Kerékjártó of Hungary in 2:02.12, but missed the semifinals by a hundredth of a second (0.01), as he placed seventeenth overall in the preliminaries.

At the 2005 FINA World Championships in Montreal, Canada, Lucas rebounded another loss by missing the final of the 200 m individual medley, but urged to break a 2:02 barrier in 2:01.99.

Lucas sought his bid to qualify for the 2008 Summer Olympics in Beijing. He finished second behind Leith Brodie in 2:01.84 at the Olympic trials, but failed to attain a FINA A-cut of 2:01.40, just 0.34 of a second short of his entry time. On the same year, Lucas was honoured for his "Speedo Services to the Australian Swimming Team" at the Telstra Swimmer of the Year Awards in Sydney, following his retirement from the sport.

In 2011, Lucas was inducted into the Western Australian Amateur Swimming Association's Hall of Fame.

References

External links
 
 Adam Lucas  Swimcloud profile

1983 births
Living people
Australian male medley swimmers
Olympic swimmers of Australia
Swimmers at the 2004 Summer Olympics
Sportspeople from Hobart
Sportsmen from Tasmania
Universiade medalists in swimming
Universiade bronze medalists for Australia
Medalists at the 2003 Summer Universiade
20th-century Australian people
21st-century Australian people